Daphnia barbata is a species of water flea within the family Daphniidae. It occurs in several places within Africa including Lake Chad in northwest Africa and in the Makgadikgadi Pan in Botswana.

See also
 Cryptobiosis

References

Cladocera
Freshwater crustaceans of Africa
Crustaceans described in 1898